Lavigne is a French surname meaning literally "the vine" or "the vineyard". Notable people with the surname include:

Antoine Joseph Lavigne (1816–1886), French oboist
Ariane Lavigne (born 1984), Canadian snowboarder
Avril Lavigne (born 1984), Canadian Grammy Award–nominated rock singer
Brad Lavigne, Canadian political and corporate communications strategist
Charles Lavigne (1840–1913), Roman Catholic bishop
J. Conrad Lavigne (1916–2003), Canadian media proprietor
Grant Lavigne (born 1999), American baseball player
Jenny Lavigne, Canadian ice hockey player
Laurent Lavigne (1935–2017), member of the Canadian House of Commons
Raymond Lavigne (born 1945), Canadian senator and businessman
Steve Lavigne (born 1962), American comic book illustrator
Valentin Lavigne (born 1994), French association football player
Yanna Lavigne (born 1989), Brazilian actress

French-language surnames